The colectivo 64 is a bus line of Buenos Aires, Argentina, that goes through the neighbourhoods of La Boca, San Telmo, Monserrat, San Nicolás, Balvanera, Recoleta, Palermo and Belgrano.

References

External links 
Up-to-date route (Spanish)

Bus routes in Buenos Aires